Mount Glasgow is a prominent  pyramid-shaped summit located between the Elbow River valley and Little Elbow River valley of Kananaskis Country in the Canadian Rockies of Alberta, Canada. The peak is visible from Calgary, weather permitting. Mount Glasgow's nearest higher peak is Mount Cornwall,  to the southwest.

History

Peter Fidler, the first non-native to visit southern Alberta, took bearings on this identifiable peak as he traveled south across the prairies near present-day Calgary. He wrote of it: "a remarkable high cliff, very much resembling a pyramid - from which very near resemblance I shall call it by that name." This is the first known instance of a non-native naming a peak in the Canadian Rockies.

The mountain's name became official in 1939 by the Geographical Names Board of Canada.

The first ascent of the peak was made in 1949 by Arnold Choquette.

Geology

Mount Glasgow is composed of sedimentary rock laid down during the Precambrian to Jurassic periods. Formed in shallow seas, this sedimentary rock was pushed east and over the top of younger rock during the Laramide orogeny.

Climate

Based on the Köppen climate classification, Mount Glasgow is located in a subarctic climate with cold, snowy winters, and mild summers. Temperatures can drop below  with wind chill factors below . Precipitation runoff from the mountain drains into the Elbow River which is a tributary of the Bow River.

See also
List of mountains of Canada
Geology of Alberta

References

Gallery

External links

 Mount Glasgow weather web site: Mountain Forecast
 Mt. Glasgow photo: Flickr

Glasgoww
Glasgowl